Calvaria Church (Romanian: Biserica Romano-Catolică Calvaria de la Cluj-Mănăștur) was built in the small village of Mănăștur near Cluj-Napoca (today a district of Cluj-Napoca). A small Benedictine abbey surrounded by defensive walls, Calvaria Church was built starting in the 9th-10th centuries.

Image gallery 

Churches in Cluj-Napoca
Historic monuments in Cluj County
Roman Catholic churches in Romania
Benedictine monasteries in Romania
Former Christian monasteries in Romania
Former Greek-Catholic churches in Romania